Pool B of the 2015 Fed Cup Asia/Oceania Group II was one of four pools in the Asia/Oceania Group II of the 2015 Fed Cup. Three teams competed in a round robin competition, with the top team and bottom teams proceeding to their respective sections of the play-offs: the top team played for advancement to Group I.

Standings

Round-robin

Kyrgyzstan vs. Iran

Turkmenistan vs. Iran

Turkmenistan vs. Kyrgyzstan

See also
Fed Cup structure

References

External links
 Fed Cup website

A2